Michael Cooke (born 17 December 1953) is a former Australian rules footballer who played with Hawthorn in the Victorian Football League (VFL).

Cooke was the first ever Hawthorn player to make his league debut in a final. Due to indifferent form, full-forward Michael Moncrieff was moved by coach John Kennedy to defence for the 1975 Semi Final against North Melbourne at Waverley Oval and Cooke was called up to fill the full-forward position. An Old Carey player, he had put in some impressive performances at full-forward in the reserves, where he teamed up well with brother, centre half-forward Robert.

Cooke's four goals in the semi final helped Hawthorn book a spot in the premiership decider, for which he kept his spot in the side. Cooke struggled in the grand final and was replaced without managing a kick. He never played another senior game and finished his career in Olinda.

References

1953 births
Australian rules footballers from Victoria (Australia)
Hawthorn Football Club players
Living people
People educated at Carey Baptist Grammar School